In optics and especially laser science,  the Rayleigh length or Rayleigh range,  is the distance along the propagation direction of a beam from the waist to the place where the area of the cross section is doubled. A related parameter is the confocal parameter, b, which is twice the Rayleigh length. The Rayleigh length is particularly important when beams are modeled as Gaussian beams.

Explanation

For a Gaussian beam propagating in free space along the  axis with wave number , the Rayleigh length is given by

This equation and those that follow assume that the waist is not extraordinarily small; . 

The radius of the beam at a distance  from the waist is

At distance  from the beam waist, the beam radius is increased by a factor  and the cross sectional area by 2.

Related quantities
The total angular spread of a Gaussian beam in radians is related to the Rayleigh length by

The diameter of the beam at its waist (focus spot size) is given by

.

These equations are valid within the limits of the paraxial approximation. For beams with much larger divergence the Gaussian beam model is no longer accurate and a physical optics analysis is required.

See also
 Beam divergence
 Beam parameter product
 Gaussian function
 Electromagnetic wave equation
 John Strutt, 3rd Baron Rayleigh
 Robert Strutt, 4th Baron Rayleigh
 Depth of field

References

Rayleigh length RP Photonics Encyclopedia of Optics

Physical optics